Melaleuca stereophloia is a plant in the myrtle family, Myrtaceae and is endemic to the south west of Western Australia. It is similar to the broombush, Melaleuca uncinata with its needle-like leaves and heads of yellow to white flowers, but its bark is hard and fibrous rather than papery .

Description

The flowers are yellow to white and arranged in heads or short spikes on the sides of the branches. There are five bundles of stamens around the flower, each with 3 to 7 stamens.

Taxonomy and naming
The specific epithet (stereophloia) is from the Greek word stereos meaning 'hard' or 'solid',  and phloios, 'bark', referring to the hard bark of this species.

Distribution and habitat
Melaleuca stereophloia occurs in and between the Wooramel Station, Meekatharra, Coorow and Koorda districts in the Avon Wheatbelt, Carnarvon, Coolgardie, Geraldton Sandplains, Murchison, Swan Coastal Plain and Yalgoo biogeographic regions where it grows in sand, clay or loam over laterite, granite or sandstone near watercourse, lakes, saltpans and saline areas.

Ecology
Vegetation associations where M. stereophloia is the dominant species in closed shrubland near claypans are habitat for the Slender-billed thornbill, Acanthiza iredalei.

Conservation
Melaleuca stereophloia is listed as "not threatened" by the Government of Western Australia Department of Parks and Wildlife.

Uses

Essential oils
Melaleuca stereophloia leaves have a high cineole content and may therefore be useful in the production of these compounds for flavourings, medicines and insect repellant.

Brushwood
This species coppices well and may therefore be useful in brushwood production.

References

stereophloia
Myrtales of Australia
Plants described in 1999
Rosids of Western Australia
Endemic flora of Western Australia
Taxa named by Lyndley Craven